Chai Keong Toh  is a Singaporean computer scientist, engineer, industry director, former VP/CTO and university professor. He is currently an Expert Consultant to the Gerson Lehrman Group. He was formerly Assistant Chief Executive (Engineering & Technology) of Infocomm Development Authority (IDA) Singapore. He has performed research on wireless ad hoc networks, mobile computing, Internet Protocols, and multimedia for over two decades. Toh's current research is focused on Internet-of-Things (IoT), architectures, platforms, and applications behind the development of smart cities.

Early life
Born in Singapore, Toh studied in Singapore Polytechnic and then received his university education in the United Kingdom. He subsequently moved to live and work in the United States. He studied at King's College, Cambridge under a Cambridge Commonwealth Trust Scholarship, and received his Ph.D. in computer science from University of Cambridge, UK in 1996 and his undergraduate EE degrees at the University of Manchester Institute of Science and Technology in 1991.

Industry, public sector and universities
From 2002 to 2004, Toh was the Director of Research, Communication Systems, at TRW Systems Corporation (now Northrop Grumman Inc) in Carson, California. After his PhD in 1996,  he joined Hughes Research Laboratories in Malibu, California. At Hughes, he co-led the DARPA TTO DAMAN (Deployable and Adaptive Mobile Ad Hoc Networks) Program. Earlier on, he worked as an engineer  at Advanced Logic Research Computers, Archive Corporation, and served on the technology advisory board of Convergence Corporation (acquired by Amazon).

Since 2011, he has been appointed the Tsing Hua Honor Chair Professor of Computer Science (Taiwan). He has also been an Honorary Professor at the University of Hong Kong, China (2004–2009), Honorary Professor at the University of Essex, UK (2013–2015), Honorary Professor at the University of Haute Alsace, FRANCE (2013), and Advisory Professor of Computer Science at Technical University of Valencia, SPAIN. Earlier on, he was a tenured Chair Professor at the University of London (2004–2006) and on the faculty at University of California, Irvine and at Georgia Institute of Technology.

In 2014, Toh was appointed as Assistant Chief Executive (Engineering And Technology), of Infocomm Development Authority of Singapore (IDA) in 2014. He was concurrently the Chief Engineering & Technology Officer (CETO) of IDA. He left Infocomm Media Development Authority (formerly known as IDA) and joined Singapore Power Telecom Ltd as VP and CTO.

Inventions and awards
Toh was as an IEEE Expert Lecturer of the IEEE Communications Society from 2002 to 2003. He is also listed among the top 20 authors in Wireless/Mobile Networks in the world by THOMSON Essential Science Indicators (ESI) for technical papers published from 1995 to 2005. His GoogleScholar.com and Harzing.com Publish or Perish total citation exceeds 20,000. Subsequently, he returned to United States.

Toh also invented Associativity-Based Routing and Wireless Mobile Ad Hoc Networks (Wi-Fi Ad-Hoc Mode). His first successful implementation of Wi-Fi Ad-Hoc Mode was achieved in 1998 when he established a working wireless ad hoc network in Georgia, USA. In 2009, he challenged the "always-on" Internet model, claiming that the resulting energy burden globally is not sustainable. Instead, he advocated re-designing existing Internet architecture, routers, switches, servers and data centers. In 2011, he invented a method to identify witnesses during car accidents using a distributed information dissemination and data fusion approach. In 2009, he introduced "signs that talk", transforming traffic signs into wireless digital forms

He is an elected Fellow of the IEEE (FIEEE), a Fellow of the American Association for the Advancement of Science (FAAAS), Fellow of the British Computer Society (FBCS), Fellow of IEE (Institution of Electrical Engineers), Fellow of HKIE Hong Kong Institution of Engineers, Fellow of IITP (Institute of IT Professionals - formerly known as New Zealand Computer Society), Fellow of Cambridge Commonwealth Society, and Life Fellow of the Cambridge Philosophical Society, UK. He is a Chartered Engineer (UK) and Chartered IT Professional (CITP).

In 2005, IEEE awarded him the IEEE Institution Kiyo Tomiyasu Technical Field Award, with the citation – "for pioneering contributions to communication protocols in ad hoc mobile wireless networks". He has undertaken research in wireless ad hoc networks since 1993 (while at Cambridge University) and had written two sole-authored pioneering books: "Wireless ATM & Ad Hoc Networks" (Kluwer, 1997) and "Ad Hoc Mobile Wireless Networks" (Prentice Hall Best Seller, 2001). In 2009, IET awarded him the John Ambrose Fleming Medal (IET Achievement Medals) in London. In 2019, he was elected to the Royal Academy of Engineering, UK.

Bibliography

Books
 - also published in Japan (Japanese translation) and India (paperback edition)

Noted papers/patents

Keynotes and media
, "Creating A Smarter Country" - Malaysia Business Radio BFM89.9 (2015), Malaysia
, PACIS 2015, Singapore 
"Opening Address: 5G & Smart Nation", Next Gen Mobile Networks Alliance NGMN 2015, Singapore
, WirelessDays Conference, November 2013, Spain 
, IEEE WAVE Conference, 2009, Shanghai, China
"Future Research Challenges for Intelligent Transportation Networks", IFIP Networks Conference, 2008, Singapore
, IEEE IPCCC Conference (2003), Arizona, USA
, IEEE Expert Lectures, 2002. Norway/Sweden/Finland.

References

Living people
Singaporean people of Chinese descent
Singaporean scientists
Fellows of the Royal Academy of Engineering
Fellows of the British Computer Society
Fellow Members of the IEEE
Fellows of the American Association for the Advancement of Science
Fellows of the Institution of Engineering and Technology
Alumni of King's College, Cambridge
Alumni of the University of Manchester Institute of Science and Technology
People associated with the University of Manchester Institute of Science and Technology
Cambridge Commonwealth Trust Scholars
Chief technology officers
Year of birth missing (living people)